Ich bin ein Star – Holt mich hier raus!, also known colloquially as the Dschungelcamp (Jungle Camp), is a German reality television show, based on the British reality television show I'm a Celebrity...Get Me Out of Here!. The show is produced by ITV Studios Germany and began airing on 9 January 2004 on RTL, and until now have been broadcast 16 seasons.

The format sees a group of ten to twelve celebrities, who have usually already appeared on television, live for up to two weeks in a so-called jungle camp in Australia under constant surveillance by television cameras. The aim of the participants is to win the favor of the audience and to stay in the camp for as long as possible in order to be crowned as "King or Queen". Since season 13 (2019), the winner has also received a prize of €100,000.

History
The show is hosted since the first season by Sonja Zietlow and since season 16 together with Jan Köppen, replacing Daniel Hartwich who co-hosted the show since season 7 as he back then replaced the deceased Dirk Bach. The health and wellbeing of the celebrities and crew is looked after by Medic Bob McCarron and his team from EMS.

In summer of 2015, a spin-off show with the title Ich bin ein Star – Lasst mich wieder rein! (I'm a Star - Let me in again!) was aired. Brigitte Nielsen won the show and qualified for the following season of the original show.

In 2021, due the COVID-19 pandemic a new season wasn't aired, but on 15 January 2021 will begin airing a spin-off show with the name Ich bin ein Star – Die große Dschungelshow (I'm a Star - The Great Jungle Show). In 15 live episodes, the first campmate for the 2022 anniversary season, was found among new prominent applicants. Production took place in the Nobeo studios in Hürth-Efferen.

Since 2018, the events of the show have been discussed in the spin-off show Ich bin ein Star – Die Stunde danach (I'm a Star - The Hour After), moderated by Angela Finger-Erben.

Filming location

Like in the British and the 2003 American versions, also the German version is produced in Dungay, near Murwillumbah, New South Wales, Australia. The leaseholder of the area is the British production company Independent Television, formerly Granada Television, which extensively redesigned and built on the previously open area and equipped it with camera and sound technology. During the filming in particular, the area is shielded by military uniformed guards.

Dschungelprüfungen
Dschungelprüfungen (Bushtucker trials) are used in the show to allow the contestants to gain food and treats for camp. One contestant, sometimes two or rarely more than one contestant, has to pass a trial every day. These trials usually consist of overcoming scary or repulsive situations, for example by having to prepare smaller animals or parts of animals (e.g. testicles), or eat them dead or alive. In addition, in most exams, contestants are awarded e.g.  Maggots, beetles and spiders showered or otherwise confronted with them. Since 2020, RTL and the production company announced that eating trials will no longer contain live bugs.

Series details

Main series
Order of Place in the following tables are as voted by the viewers.

Spin-off shows

References

External links 

 Official website of Ich bin ein Star – Holt mich hier raus!
 Official ITV website of Ich bin ein Star - Holt mich hier raus!
 

 
German reality television series
RTL (German TV channel) original programming
2004 German television series debuts
2004 German television series endings
2008 German television series debuts
2009 German television series endings
2011 German television series debuts
2020s German television series
Television series by ITV Studios
Television shows set in Australia
German-language television shows